The 2009–10 Virginia Tech Hokies men's basketball team represented the Virginia Tech in the 2009–10 NCAA Division I men's basketball season. The Hokies were coached by Seth Greenberg and played their home games at Cassell Coliseum in Blacksburg, Virginia. The Hokies are a members of the Atlantic Coast Conference. They finished the season 25–9, 10–6 in ACC play and lost in the quarterfinals of the 2010 ACC men's basketball tournament. They were invited to the 2010 National Invitation Tournament where they advanced to the quarterfinals before falling to Rhode Island.

Roster
Source

2009-10 Schedule and results
Source
All times are Eastern

|-
!colspan=9| Regular season

|-
!colspan=9| ACC tournament

|-
!colspan=9| 2010 National Invitation Tournament

References

Virginia Tech Hokies
Virginia Tech Hokies men's basketball seasons
Virginia Tech
Virginia Tech
Virginia Tech